Lepidochrysops victori, the Victor's blue, is a species of butterfly in the family Lycaenidae. It is endemic to South Africa, where it is only known from four small areas on the Groot Winterberg in the Eastern Cape.

The wingspan is 31–35 mm for males and 32–36 mm for females. Adults are on wing from mid-February to the end of March. There is one generation per year.

The larvae feed on Selago corymbosa.

References

Lepidochrysops
Butterflies described in 1984
Endemic butterflies of South Africa
Taxonomy articles created by Polbot